The Miss Tierra República Dominicana 2010 pageant was held on October 12, 2010. This year 30 candidates competed for the national earth crown. The winner represented the Dominican Republic at the Miss Earth 2010 beauty pageant, which was held in Vietnam.

Results

Special awards
 Miss Photogenic (voted by press reporters) - Yulenny Valdéz (La Romana)
 Miss Congeniality (voted by contestants) - Vicky Burgos (Pedernales)
 Best Face - Wisleidy Osorio (Samaná)
 Best Provincial Costume - Wisleidy Osorio (Samaná)
 Miss Cultura - Ninoska Serrano (Espaillat)
 Miss Elegancia - María Tavarez (Azua)
 Best Representation of their Province or Municipality - Perla del Rio (Santiago)

Delegates

External links
 Official Website

Miss Dominican Republic
2010 beauty pageants
2010 in the Dominican Republic